FirstVoices is a web-based project to support Indigenous peoples' teaching and archiving of language and culture. It is administered by the First Peoples' Cultural Council in British Columbia (B.C.).

FirstVoices was initially launched in 2003 to aid in the preservation of the remaining 34 Indigenous languages in B.C. It provides a space for Indigenous community language teams to archive their languages by recording and uploading words, phrases, songs and stories to a secure, centralized database. Some archives are publicly accessible, but others are password-protected at the request of the individual language community. FirstVoices hosts 47 (36 public and 11 private) language archives in B.C. and also supports 70 First Nations communities in Canada, the US and Australia. Content is entirely controlled and managed by community language administrators.

FirstVoices provides the following tools so that each archive can be customized to the languages it serves:

 An alphabet provides the written character set for a language, with sample sound files for each character.
 A dictionary provides a word list, with translations, definitions, sounds, images and video.
 A phrase book contains everyday conversational language with related text, sound, image and video files to support language learning.

FirstVoices 2.0 

On January 29, 2018, the First Peoples' Cultural Foundation announced the relaunch of a beta version of FirstVoices.com.

Over three years, the FirstVoices website and back-end system was significantly upgraded with input from over 50 community partners across B.C. and feature improved navigation, easier data entry and faster access to language information and resources.

FirstVoices.com also features the following improvements:

A faster loading website – language administrators will be able to upload larger media files and all users of the site can navigate quickly and easily through the content of an archive.
Time-saving searches – a better search function means that each language archive now has its own search tool, which means users can search for words, phrases, songs and stories within a single archive.
New ways to enter data – users can now add multiple sounds files, video and images for a single word or phrase entry, which removes the need for duplicate entries.

FirstVoices language apps

FirstVoices dictionary apps

There are twelve interactive dictionary and phrase apps in B.C.'s First Nations languages available for iOS and Android devices. The apps contain text, audio, image and video content.

FirstVoices keyboards

The FirstVoices Keyboard App contains keyboard software for over 100 languages, and includes every First Nations language in Canada, Australia and New Zealand, plus many languages in the US.

When the FirstVoices Keyboard app is installed on a mobile phone or tablet, any one of the 100+ custom keyboards can be activated in any application on the device. Users are able to select their keyboard(s) of choice within their email, social media, word processing or other apps, enabling unlimited communication in their mother language.

FirstVoices Kids

FirstVoices Kids is a set of interactive online games providing pre-readers with access to the language resources at FirstVoices.com. It has large colorful pictures, simple language games, and recordings of Elders speaking their language arranged to be usable by pre-readers and their family.

The FirstVoices Kids interface uses pictures to guide pre-readers through a series of simple steps to hear their language spoken and to associate words with pictures. The games also provide small motor development skills for novice computer users.  Community-based language recorders select which language resources to make accessible at FV Kids, ensuring that the content is suitable for young audiences.

FirstVoices Language Tutor

In 2009, FirstVoices launched the FirstVoices Language Tutor, an interactive online teaching application. The FirstVoices Language Tutor uses language exercises in vocabulary development, reading comprehension, listening and speaking. Language Tutor lessons are customizable and can be targeted to specific age groups or curriculum. Any word or phrase in an existing FirstVoices language archive can be used in a Language Tutor lesson, or new words and phrases can be added. The Language Tutor also offers a student tracking system that allows teachers to follow the progress of an entire classroom of students.

Haida language 
One of the languages covered on FirstVoices is Haida. Haida is an endangered language predominantly spoken by the Elders of the community in Haida Gwaii, Canada and Prince of Wales Island in Alaska. The language is divided into Northern and Southern dialects, Alaskan and Skidegate respectively, although FirstVoices only covers Skidegate. Because it is an endangered language, efforts to restore and revitalize it are becoming more evident. In 2017, a film spoken entirely in Haida called Edge of the Knife was produced. The fluent speaking Elders fueled the actors by teaching them their language. Another method of revitalization could be through enhancement of community-based tourism by changing community signs in Haida Gwaii from English to English-Haida.

Skidegate Haida language app 
The Skidegate Haida language app is an online learning dictionary that utilizes recorded voices of the Elder speakers. Through the use of FirstVoices.com Aboriginal languages database, the Skidegate Haida language app was created. It is a bilingual (English-Haida) language learning app inclusive of a dictionary, collection of phrases and multi-media designed to make learning engaging and receptive for those learning. All word and phrase recordings are done by the fluent Elder speakers of the community as they wish to keep their language true to Haida.

See also
Language education
List of Language Self-Study Programs

Notes and references

External links
FirstVoices.com
The First Peoples' Heritage, Language and Culture Council
The First Peoples' Cultural Foundation

Indigenous languages of the Americas
Native American language revitalization
First Nations culture
Language-learning websites
Language learning software
Internet properties established in 2013
2013 establishments in British Columbia
Canadian educational websites